Brady Joe McDonnell (born July 24, 1977) is a former American football tight end who played for the New York Giants and Buffalo Bills of the National Football League (NFL). He played college football at University of Colorado Boulder.

References 

1977 births
Living people
People from Rapid City, South Dakota
Players of American football from South Dakota
American football tight ends
Colorado Buffaloes football players
New York Giants players
Buffalo Bills players